In electrocardiography, the atrial action potential are action potentials that occur in the heart atrium. They are similar to ventricular action potential with the exception of having a more narrow phase 2 (plateau phase) due to a smaller calcium influx. Also, in comparison to the ventricular action potential, atrial action potentials have a more gradual repolarization period. This indicates that the atria's repolarization currents are not very large and they do not undergo a large repolarization peak.

See also
Cardiac action potential

References

Cardiac electrophysiology
Action potentials